Laney Stewart (born January 10, 1966) is an American songwriter, music producer, musician, music publisher, music executive, manager and youth mentor.

He was born Philip Lane Stewart II, in the South Side suburbs of Chicago, Illinois. Laney has penned, produced and published hits for some of the biggest names in R&B, hip hop and pop music over the past three decades. In addition to his individual achievements, he also has a proven ear and consistent track record of recognizing and developing unknown talent on their way to success. The long list of hits he has created, published and or managed is a testament to both his creative and business acumen.

Early life
Laney had a mother, Mary Ann Stewart, who was a successful singer in her own right, having sung backgrounds for the Ohio Players, Curtis Mayfield and Aretha Franklin.  His uncle, Morris "Butch" Stewart was a successful musician and producer.  By age nine, Laney had taught himself how to play piano and drums.  With the advertising business booming in Chicago, Laney started singing on jingles at the age of 12.  As a teenager, he made the transition to writing and composing with a career doing his own jingles. By 15, he had his first commercially released songs on CBS Records with Ramsey Lewis' "This Ain't No Fantasy."  At the age of 16, he became a regular in the burgeoning Chicago underground house music scene, and became one of the early house producers, producing songs for Arrogance such as, "Crazy,"  which was released on DJ International Records in 1986.  Eventually, Laney began working as a session musician with his uncle, Wayne Stewart, Tony Brown and Patrick Leonard.  Laney's most significant keyboard influence was Leonard, who was known for his work with Madonna, "Like a Prayer" etc.  By 18, Stewart and partner Kenneth Hale formed their own jingle company, Minute Men, composing popular spots for Bud Light, McDonald's and Coca-Cola.  They became the "go to" guys for urban based spots for advertising juggernauts like the Burrell ad agency and DDB Needham.  They even won an award for their work on the California Lottery ad campaign.  He was doing House clubs at night, jingle sessions and meetings with ad executives by day.

1988 to 1998
In 1988, with the help of ad executive and acclaimed author, Michelle McKinney Hammond, Laney signed his first publishing deal with Famous Music (now Sony/ATV Music Publishing).  Within the first couple years of his deal, Laney had linked up with songwriting partner, Tony Haynes, for a string of placements and would wisely upgrade his deal to a joint venture with Famous Music.  With a publishing deal and a machine behind him, he decided to focus his career on working with recording artists instead of jingles.  In 1990, he & Tony Haynes formed The Groove Asylum, which soon put him in the studio working with Jimmy Jam and Terry Lewis, who had a tremendous influence on Laney's songwriting and production style.  With his dual roles at Groove Asylum and Famous, he was co-producing songs with Jimmy Jam and Terry Lewis, in addition to working with well-known recording artists.  At the same time he was fine-tuning his business savvy by signing a group of young writers to his production company, including his younger brother, Christopher "Tricky" Stewart Tricky Stewart, Kuk Harrell and Sean Hall.  He brought his other younger brother Mark E. Stewart and future sister in-law Judi into the company as well, on the business side.

Laney's next big influence would be legendary MCA Records executive, Louil Silas Jr., who was won over by Laney's abilities.  Before he knew it, he would be working with execs like Sylvia Rhone, Benny Medina and Quincy Jones, putting together a run of successful songs, including "Never Let Them See You Sweat" by Go West, which was featured in White Men Can't Jump, and "Candlelight and You" by Keith Washington featuring Chante Moore, which was featured in House Party 2.

In 1992 Stewart relocated his company from Chicago to Los Angeles, CA and would eventually become a founding partner, along with his brothers Tricky and Mark, in RedZone Entertainment in 1994.

In 1996 Laney entered into a publishing deal and writing/production relationship with Kenneth "Babyface" Edmonds and his Edmonds Music Publishing company. Babyface's songwriting guidance had a major influence on Laney's.  This high-powered relationship led him to work with Madonna, Shanice, and Tony! Toni! Toné! in addition to writing and producing songs for the feature film Soul Food. During this time he also wrote and produced the top 10 hit "Last Nights Letter" for K-Ci & JoJo’s Quadruple platinum album Love Always .

Redzone and Atlanta
In 1999 Laney relocated to Atlanta GA to join his brothers as a partner in RedZone Entertainment and Triangle Sound Studios. RedZone RedZone Entertainment helped put Atlanta on the map as a music city over the next few years with hits like Blu Cantrell's "Hit ‘Em Up Style," Sole's "4,5,6", TLC's "No Scrubs", Toni Braxton's "Love Me Some Him," and Destiny's Child's "Bills, Bills, Bills."  Laney eventually took over the position of president of RedZone, which included overseeing the day-to-day operations of the company and keeping it active. Under his watch super hit songwriter, Ester Dean, was also added to Redzone on the Publishing side.  With his dual role as music executive and producer, Laney continued his work penning and producing hit songs including, # 1 A.C. smash "Without You"  by Charlie Wilson, and "Everything" which appears on multi-platinum selling B2K’s Pandemonium and Greatest Hits albums.

Publisher
In his role as a publisher, Laney flourished amassing a huge publishing catalog that rivals anyone's. Unlike a lot of Publishers, he actually worked hands on with the writers, developing their skills and growing the catalog.  Laney mentored Christopher "Tricky" Stewart, Kuk Harrell, and Sean Hall, imparting on them the secrets to consistent hitmaking that had been passed down to him from Jam & Lewis and Babyface amongst others.  In addition to some of Tricky's songs, Laney's publishing includes songs performed by Britney Spears, Usher, Pink, Sisqo, Toni Braxton, Tyrese, and the 1999 the ASCAP Rap song of the year, "Who Dat" by JT Money, which reached #5 on the Billboard pop charts.  One of the biggest R&B tracks in the catalog is "I Love Me Some Him" off of Toni Braxton's "Secrets" album, which went 8 x Platinum.  "Me Against The Music" stands out in the catalog as a duet with Britney Spears and Madonna that peaked at #1 on the Billboard Hot Dance Club Songs chart and was recently featured on an episode of Fox's "Glee."  Pink's "Can't Take Me Home" added a double platinum plaque to Laney's publishing collection along with platinum and double platinum sales worldwide as well.  Other pop hits included "Case of the Ex" by Mýa, which peaked at number two in its 16th week on the Billboard Hot 100 chart and at #1 on Billboard's R&B chart.  It spent 3 weeks at number two and 29 consecutive weeks on the Billboard Hot 100 chart and was also an international success.  In 1999 there was 3LW’s "No More" and in 2001 there was B2K’s premier smash "Uh-Huh," which was the number one selling Single in the U.S that year.

The-Dream and Morningside Trail Music
Laney's next step as an entrepreneur would be entering into another publishing joint venture with Peer Music, forming Morningside Trail Music in 2003. He discovered, developed and then signed writer/producer Terius "The-Dream" Nash.  A year after an unsuccessful initial meeting, The-Dream was able to impress Laney enough to get back in the studio with him.  Their first night of working together resulted in the song, "Everything," which ended up on B2K's album.  Laney worked hard to develop The-Dream's songwriting abilities and consistency.  Under Laney's tutelage The-Dream has developed into an award-winning super writer/producer and recording artist with hits like "Shawty is the S*^!" and "Falsetto." Laney first introduced The-Dream to his brother Tricky and that partnership lead to a list of hits, from Rihanna's "Umbrella," J. Holiday's "Bed" and "Suffocate," to Mariah Carey's "Touch My Body," Usher's "Moving Mountains," Mary J. Blige's "Just Fine," & Justin Bieber's "Baby," and Beyoncé's "Single Ladies."

2005 to present
In 2005, Laney had to take a break after learning he was suffering from kidney cancer and failure. Laney took time to evaluate the evolving music business climate and in 2009 he, along with his wife, formed Stewart Music Group, combining publishing, production and management. In 2010 was blessed to receive a transplant kidney from his wife and while still in the hospital recuperating from transplant surgery he finalized the deal for a new joint venture with Universal Music Publishing Group , the largest music publishing company in the world.  Laney is now developing a new publishing catalog under Music Gallery and a new writing/production team called The SharpShootaz, was his first signing.  Each writer in The Sharpshootaz was hand picked by Laney himself, including Alex Jacke, Romika Faniel, Derek Yopp, Andrew Kim and Sidney Miller. In late 2011, The Sharpshootaz got in the studio with Jesse McCartney and recorded several songs, including "Out Of Words," which was leaked to the internet in July 2012. On July 9, 2012, Laney and The Sharpshootaz released an Alex Jacke EP called, "D.F.M."  The SharpShootaz  continue to work on music for more of today's hottest artists.  Stewart Music Group currently consists of Music Gallery/UMPG Publishing, "The System" Management and Consulting, and LS Productions.  Laney continues to be an important figure in the industry.

Personal life
Laney lives in Los Angeles, California and is married to Khaila Stewart with three children, Jordan, Clarke and Christopher. Laney and Khaila are involved in research at UCLA for kidney disease and living donor transplants.

Discography as songwriter and producer

B2K			Pandemonium	        Epic
 Everything
B2K			B2K Greatest Hits 	Epic
 Everything

Alex Jacke                D.F.M.
 One Thing
 Callin For You
 Nobody's Perfect
 Enjoy The Ride
 All She Wrote
 Days Of Our Lives

Alex Jacke                D.F.M. Deluxe
 One Thing
 Callin For You
 Nobody's Perfect
 Enjoy The Ride
 All She Wrote
 Days Of Our Lives
 No Hands
 Love To Love Ya
 We Should Have Sex
 Pure Perfection

Chante Moore		Millennium Collection	Geffen
 Candlelight & You
 Old School Lovin’
 Train of Thought

Shawn Desman              Back For More           UOMO/Sony BMG
 Ooh

Blu Cantrell		So Blu  		RedZone/Arista
 10,000 Times
 It's Alright

Snow			Two Hands Clapping	Virgin/Canada
 Legal
 Stay Ballin’

Chante Moore		Exposed		        MCA
 Bitter
 Train of Thought
 Why Am I Lonely

Charlie Wilson		Bridging the Gap	Interscope
 Without You
 Come Back My Way
 Charlie's Angel
 Can I Take You Home

K-Ci & JoJo		Love Always	        MCA
 Last Night's Letter

Honey			(Single Only)		(International)
 More Than Love

Kandi			Hey Kandi...		Columbia
 Just So You Know

Ideal			Ideal			Virgin
 I Don't Mind

Shanice                   Shanice                 Laface
 Fly Away

Her Sanity		Xclusive		Universal
 Can I Be Sure

Billy Crawford		Billy Crawford		V2
 I Wish
 Someone Like You
 If It's Alright
Billy Crawford            Big City                V2
 Bright Lights

Winans			We Got Next		Myrrh
 Everyday Away

Coko			Hot Coko		RCA
 This Ain’t Love

Shanice		        Shanice		        LaFace/Arista
 Fly Away

Tony, Toni, Tone	Soul Food Sdtk. 	LaFace/Arista
 Boys & Girls
Tony, Toni, Tone        Greatest Hits		Mercury
 Boys & Girls

Sam Salter		It's On Tonight		LaFaceArista
 After 12 Before 6
 There You Are
 Every Time A Car Drives By
 One My Heart
 I Love You Both
 It Took A Song

Jesse Powell		All I Need		Silas/MCA
 All I Need

IV Example		IV Example		MCA
 From The Fool

Chante Moore		Love Supreme 		MCA
 Old School Lovin’
 Who Do I Turn To
Chante Moore              Straight Up             MCA
 Train Of Thought
Chante Moore		Precious		MCA
 Candlelight & You
 Without Your Love

Keith Washington	        Make Time For Love	Qwest/Warner
 When You Love Somebody
 Ready, Willing, & Able

E.V.E.			E.V.E.			MCA
 Grove of Love
 Thinkin’
 Good Love

Regina Belle		Regina Belle		Columbia
 The Deeper I Love

Darnell Owens             Single                  MCA
 Since You Went Away

Aaron Hall		The Truth		Silas/MCA
 Let's Make Love
 Until I Found You
 Freaky
 Pick Up The Phone

Jason Weaver              The Jacksons: An American Dream    Motown
 I Wanna Be Where You Are

Go West                   The Best of Go West     Chrysalis
 Aces and Kings
Go West                   White Men Can't Jump    EMI USA
 Never Let Them See You Sweat

Karyn White		Rituals of Love 	Warner Bros.
 How I Want You
 Walking The Dog
 Beside You

The Whispers		The Whispers		Capital
 Come On Home

Nicki Richards		Naked (To The World)	Atlantic
 Fire's Burning
 What's Going On
 Dirty Job

Louis Price               Louis Price             Motown
 Flesh & Blood

Altitude                  Single                  Bahia Entertainment
 Work It Like A 9 to 5

Sue Ann Carwell           Pain Killer		MCA
 Sex or Love
 7 Days & Nights

Patrick O'hearn           Mix Up                  Private Music
 Journey to Yoroba (Remix)

Arrogant                  12"                     DJ International Records
 Crazy

Kitty Haywood             Single                  Lance Records
 Givin It Up
 Could I Be Dreamin

Publishing highlights

Sole
Skin Deep
Dreamworkds
 4,5,6

Pink
Can't Take Me Home
LaFace
Certified 2× Platinum in US, 5× Platinum Worldwide

JT Money
Pimpin On Wax
Priority
 Who Dat
Certified Gold

Mya
Fear of Flying
Interscope
 Case Of The Ex

Sisqo
Unleash The Dragon
Def Soul
Certified Platinum

3LW
3LW
Epic Records
 No More
 Baby I'ma Do Right
 Playas Gon Play
Certified Platinum

Tyrese
Tyrese
RCA
Certified Gold, Peaked at #6 on R&B Charts, #17 on Billboard 200

B2K
B2K
Epic Records
 Everything
Peaked at #2 on Billboard 200

Color Me Badd
Now And Forever
Giant
Certified Gold

Mista
Mista
Elektra/EastWest

Usher
My Way
LaFace/Arista
Certified 6× Platinum

TLC
Fan Mail
LaFace/Arista/BMG
Certified 6× Platinum

Britney Spears
In The Zone
Jive
 Me Against The Music
Certified 2× Platinum

Britney Spears
Greatest Hits: My Prerogative
Jive
 Me Against The Music
Certified Platinum

J. Holiday
Bac Of My Lac
Music Line/Capitol
 Suffocate
Certified Gold in the U.S. and Gold Worldwide

Billy Crawford
Big City
Universal
 Bright Lights
Certified Gold

References

External links
 http://www.discogs.com/artist/Laney+Stewart
 http://www.discogs.com/artist/Chant%C3%A9+Moore
 http://www.discogs.com/Aaron-Hall-The-Truth/master/192361

1966 births
Living people
Musicians from Chicago
Record producers from Illinois
African-American record producers
Songwriters from Illinois
21st-century African-American people
20th-century African-American people